Jeruk is a located in the local government area of the Shire of Buloke, Victoria, Australia.  The post office there opened on 10 August 1880, was closed on 2 September 1901, reopened in 1904 and closed on 31 May 1930.

References

Shire of Buloke